Scenic America is a nonprofit advocacy organization and the only national group solely dedicated to removing visual blight and preserving and enhancing the scenic character of America's communities and countryside in accordance with its mission statement.

In 2017, Scenic America selected Mark Falzone as its President.

Scenic America has partnered with Project Public Spaces in securing the natural beauty and community character of many cities, towns, and public spaces.

References

External links
Scenic America's official website

Non-profit organizations based in Washington, D.C.
Communications and media organizations based in the United States
Environmental organizations based in Washington, D.C.
1978 establishments in the United States
Organizations established in 1978